is a Japanese racing driver. He currently competes in Super GT.

Career
After competing in karting in Asia, Sato spent two seasons in Formula BMW UK, ending fourth in 2007. He returned to Japan and resulted runner-up in the 2008 Formula Challenge Japan, then second and fourth in the 2009 and 2010 National Class of the All-Japan Formula Three Championship.

Back in Europe, Sato was 10th in the 2011 Formula 3 Euro Series and third in the 2012 German Formula Three. He climbed to Auto GP in 2013, where he ended second in the championship. Also in 2013, he drove for Sauber at the Formula One Young Driver Test, finishing 13th fastest on day 3 of the test.  Sato was the 25th fastest of 31 drivers overall.

For the 2014 season, he entered the GP2 Series with Campos Racing.

Racing record

Career summary

† – As Sato was a guest driver, he was ineligible for points.

‡ Team standings.

Complete Formula 3 Euro Series results
(key)

Complete Auto GP results
(key) (Races in bold indicate pole position) (Races in italics indicate fastest lap)

† Driver did not finish the race, but was classified as he completed over 90% of the race distance.

Complete GP2 Series results
(key) (Races in bold indicate pole position) (Races in italics indicate fastest lap)

Complete Super GT results
(key) (Races in bold indicate pole position) (Races in italics indicate fastest lap)

† Sato was ineligible for points at the Suzuka round.

References

External links
 
 

1989 births
Living people
Sportspeople from Kobe
Japanese racing drivers
Formula BMW UK drivers
Formula BMW Pacific drivers
Formula Challenge Japan drivers
Japanese Formula 3 Championship drivers
Formula 3 Euro Series drivers
German Formula Three Championship drivers
Auto GP drivers
GP2 Series drivers
Super GT drivers
Eurasia Motorsport drivers
Euronova Racing drivers
Motopark Academy drivers
TOM'S drivers
Fluid Motorsport Development drivers
Campos Racing drivers